Yeend is a surname. Notable people with the surname include:

 Adam J. Yeend (born 1980), Australian actor and producer 
 Frances Yeend (1913–2008), American soprano 
 Geoffrey Yeend (1927–1994), Australian public servant